Greg Beck Whiteley (born November 11, 1969) is the creator, executive producer, and director of the Netflix documentary series Cheer (2020–present) and Last Chance U (2016–2020). His films include New York Doll (2005), Resolved (2007), Mitt (2014), and Most Likely to Succeed (2015).

Whiteley’s documentaries have garnered an IDA award for best documentary series, four Emmy Awards and three premieres at the Sundance Film Festival.

Early life and education
Whiteley was born in Provo, Utah to parents Jessie and Kent Whiteley. He was raised in Bellevue, Washington where he attended Interlake High School and became a two-time debate state champion.

He served for two years, from 1989–1991, as a missionary for the Church of Jesus Christ of Latter-day Saints on the Navajo Nation in New Mexico. He then graduated from Brigham Young University in 1995 with a BA in film and received an MFA in film from Art Center College of Design in 2001.

Career
After winning two Clio Awards during graduate school at Art Center, he was hired by Populuxe Pictures to direct commercials.

From 1996 to 2000, Whiteley served as the head of Film Actors Theater in Los Angeles. While beginning work on New York Doll in 2005, he launched One Potato Productions with his wife, Erin. He named the company in homage to his recently deceased father, who grew up on an Idaho potato farm.

Whiteley wrote, filmed, and directed New York Doll in 2005. This documentary explores the history of the punk rock band New York Dolls, focusing on the life of bassist Arthur Kane after he converts to the Church of Jesus Christ of Latter-day Saints. He then created Resolved in 2006, which follows the story of a high school debate team. Whiteley spent 2006 to 2012 filming Mitt, having gained access to the Romney family, though not his campaign staff, during both of governor Mitt Romney’s campaigns for the United States presidency. From 2012 to 2014, he created Most Likely To Succeed, which discusses the education system in the United States and proposes ideas for its reform.

Personal life
Whiteley married Erin Bybee in 1999. The couple lives in Laguna Beach, California with their son, Henry, and daughter, Scout.

Filmography
 New York Doll (2005)
 Resolved (2007)
 Mitt (2014)
 Most Likely to Succeed (2015)
 Last Chance U (2016–2020)
 Cheer (2020–present)

Awards and honors
 1999 Clio Student Awards: Pepsi and Krazy Glue
 2005 nomination, Satellite Award: New York Doll (2005)
 2005 nomination, Grand Jury Prize at the Sundance Film Festival: New York Doll (2005)
 2007 Audience Award, Best Documentary at the Los Angeles Film Festival: Resolved (2007)
 2009 nomination, Emmy Award for Best Documentary: Resolved (2007)
 2009 nomination, Emmy Award for Editing: Resolved (2007)
 2014 Opening Gala Film, Sundance Film Festival: Mitt (2014)
 2016 Best Documentary Series, International Documentary Association: Last Chance U (2016)
2020 Best Nonfiction Sports Documentary Series, Realscreen Award: Last Chance U (2019)
2020 Emmy Award for Outstanding Serialized Sports Documentary : Last Chance U (2020) 
2020 Emmy Award for Outstanding Unstructured Reality Program: Cheer (2020)
2020 Emmy Award for Outstanding Directing for a Reality Program: Cheer (2020)

References

External links

1969 births
Living people
American documentary filmmakers
Brigham Young University alumni
Writers from Provo, Utah
People from Bellevue, Washington
Primetime Emmy Award winners
Filmmakers from Utah